KDAV (1590 AM) is an American radio station licensed to serve the community of Lubbock, Texas. The KDAV broadcast license was held by Monte and Gentry Todd Spearman through licensee High Plains Radio Network, LLC.

From August 18, 1998, to March 30, 2015, KDAV broadcast an oldies format which focused on 1950s and early 1960s popular, rockabilly, mild doo-wop, and country oldies.

The ownership and format of KDAV changed at 11 a.m. on March 30, 2015, as the station became part of the High Plains Radio Network.

History

The original KDAV is reportedly the first radio station anywhere to program exclusively country music. Its primary founder and namesake, David Pinkston, better known on the air as Dave Stone has been inducted in the Country Music Disc Jockey Hall of Fame in Nashville and the Texas Country Music Hall of Fame in Carthage, Texas. When the station went on the air in 1953, KDAV call letters were on a 500-watt daytimer at 580 on the AM radio dial. It began at 66th and Quirt Avenue (today known as 6602 Martin Luther King). That station was founded by Elmore, Worley, and Pinkston. David Pinkston also founded KZIP in Amarillo, Texas (1310), KPEP in San Angelo, Texas (1420), and KPIK in Colorado Springs, Colorado (1580). All of the Texas stations used a common floor plan. The Amarillo building at 808 Charlotte was razed to make room for a highway, and the San Angelo building was vacated when 1420 returned its ticket to the U.S. Federal Communications Commission, but the building still stands at 4300 North Chadbourne.

KDAV 580 became KRLB in 1979. It added an FM at 99.5 (KWGO-FM, then KRLB-FM, then KCRM, now KQBR); 580 was spun off to Big Ed Wilkes.

1590 was activated after World War II by Caprock Broadcasting Company headed by Joe Bryant. A three-tower transmitter site was installed in southeast Lubbock along the old Slaton Highway. Power was 1,000 watts, day and night, with each mode using a three-tower directional antenna system. The site was supervised by R. F. "Frank" Lee, who worked at the station until its sale in 1971, and continued at KCBD-TV until his death in 1980.

The new KDAV called itself "the Buddy Holly Station" because a young Buddy Holly performed on a weekly live music broadcast on the original KDAV before he reached stardom. The station observed Buddy Holly's career the first weekend of February, which coincides with the time of his 1959 death in a plane crash in Iowa.

The studios used to be at 1803–1805 Broadway between downtown Lubbock and Texas Tech University, but were relocated in 1953 when consolidated into the new KCBD-TV facilities at 5600 Avenue A. In 1971, KCBD radio was spun off to Lew Dee and 20 local businessmen. Call letters changed to KEND. The format had been adult middle of the road. Lew Dee changed the format to a more contemporary "The Living End" as KEND (The End of the Dial). The station had business reversals. Management traded too many things in too many deals and developed tax problems. The station was required in those days to use transmitter site operating engineers or update its equipment and procedures to permit remote control operation. Both were costly, and neither was done.

The station was sold to the Ackers, an Abilene, family, who owned KENM in Portales and Clovis, New Mexico, and were part owners, as well, of KRBC AM and KRBC-TV in Abilene. That format changed in 1975 from NBC to the National News and Information Service. In 1977, the station went country and reached the top of the Lubbock ratings as "Country 16".

KLLL AM/FM sold the 1460 station to Terry Wynn in 1982 and bought KEND. In 1988, KEND changed to KLLL. After a few more years, KLLL was sold to a local operator. From 1995 to 2015, Bill Clement owned the station. He installed a new transmitter (the 1949 sign on Western Electric transmitter gave way to a 1971 Collins 820-D) in 1995 a "Gates 1" solid state transmitter.

On August 12, 2015, KDAV changed its format from oldies to talk. On August 1, 2016, KDAV changed its format from talk to contemporary Christian, branded as "The Spirit".

Streaming
KDAV had a live stream so listeners around the world could tune in via their computers. As of September 2010, the feed which originally charged a listening fee, was again streaming free through its website.

According to the remnant of its former website, KDAV ended operations because of the high costs of streaming and the failure of the U.S. Congress to permit not-for-profits stations to use songs of deceased artists without copyright infringement.

Deejays
Bud Andrews
Jerry "Bo" Coleman
Virgil Johnson, former lead singer of The Velvets
Alex Jones
Robby C "The Toad"
 Bill Lee
Bill Clement "Billy C"
Smokin' Joe
Music With Misty
"KDAV" Dave Ruebush

References

External links
High Plains Network Texas

Radio stations established in 1953
Buddy Holly
Music of Lubbock, Texas
DAV
1953 establishments in Texas